Paraona is a genus of moths in the family Erebidae. The genus was erected by Frederic Moore in 1878. It is treated as a synonym of Macrobrochis by some sources.

Selected species
Paraona bicolor Toulgoët, 1968
Paraona cocciniceps (Mabille, 1884)
Paraona interjecta Strand, 1912
Paraona micans (Pagenstecher, 1895)
Paraona splendens (Butler, 1877)
Paraona staudingeri Alphéraky, 1897

References

Lithosiina
Moth genera